Pauley Perrette (born March 27, 1969) is an American actress and singer. She played Abby Sciuto in the television series NCIS from 2003 to 2018.

Early life
Perrette was born in New Orleans, Louisiana, and raised throughout the southern United States. She lived in Georgia, Alabama, Tennessee, North Carolina, South Carolina, New York, New Jersey, and California. In a 2011 interview with the Associated Press, Perrette confessed her early ambitions were to work with animals, be in a rock and roll band, or be an FBI agent.

Perrette attended Valdosta State University in Valdosta, Georgia, where she studied criminal justice, and later moved to New York City to study at the John Jay College of Criminal Justice. In New York, she held a variety of jobs: "Not only was I bartending in the club kids scene, with a bra and combat boots and a white Mohawk, but I also wore a sandwich board on roller skates passing out flyers for Taco Bell in the Diamond District." Perrette also worked as a cook on a Manhattan dinner cruise boat.

Career

Perrette has worked in television and film, mostly doing commercials, voice-overs, music videos and short films. She worked as a bartender in New York City. While working odd jobs in New York, she was introduced by a friend to an advertising agency director. This prompted her move to Los Angeles, where she had a variety of bit parts and made several guest appearances. She appeared as a waitress at Cafe Nervosa in the sitcom Frasier during season four (in the episode "Three Dates and a Break Up"), and she guest-starred in season one of 24. She has made appearances in several films, including The Ring and Almost Famous.

In 2001, as a recurring character introduced in season two of Special Unit 2, she played Alice Cramer, the Unit's public relations person. She landed her most prominent role, that of Abby Sciuto, an eccentric forensic scientist, in NCIS, a television series based on the Naval Criminal Investigative Service. Perrette's initial appearances as the character were in two episodes of JAG aired in spring 2003; these served as a backdoor pilot and introduced the characters. She has since appeared as Abby in two 2009 episodes of NCIS: Los Angeles, as well as in two episodes of NCIS: New Orleans in 2014 and 2016.

The character Abby Sciuto was created by Donald P. Bellisario, who "wanted to create ... a character who was seemingly an 'alternafreak', while portraying her as perhaps the smartest, most capable person on television. Not a junkie, killer, loser, or television stereotype." Perrette added some of her own "contributions" to the character, and also conferred with friend Clint Catalyst, the "author of Cottonmouth Kisses [who is] often brought in as a guest on TV shows when they are doing pieces on goth or alternative culture." Perrette explained that "Clint and I and our 3,000 closest friends all play together ... We've never sat around and labeled each other. Sure, there are nights when a certain event leans more towards one style than the other, but it's not like some turf war with gang colors." Like her character, Perrette has often been asked if she is goth or punk, to which her response is "Who cares?" Consequently, she told her employers that her character is not the type to seek out a label; Abby "wouldn't call herself anything but Abby ... What she represents is a smart, capable chick that cannot be reduced to a stereotype." On October 4, 2017, TV Guide reported that Perrette would be leaving the series at the end of the 15th season; she made her final appearance in the episode "Two Steps Back".

In addition to acting, Perrette is a poet author (her short story "Cheers..." appears in the anthology Pills, Thrills, Chills, and Heartache: Adventures in the First Person). In 2007, she began production on a documentary about U.S. civil rights attorney and author Mark Lane. Entitled Citizen Lane, it was completed in 2013. 

In a 2005 interview with Craig Ferguson, then host of The Late Late Show, Perrette said she has had a lifelong crime obsession. She was an undergrad student in sociology, psychology, and criminal science. She started her master's degree in criminal science before her career in the entertainment industry.

In the January/February 2010 Performer Q Score, Perrette tied in the top three alongside Tom Hanks and Morgan Freeman. She was also the only woman to make the top 10. Perrette began appearing in television commercials for Expedia.com in late 2010. She made a guest appearance as a judge on season four, episode six of RuPaul's Drag Race. As of winter 2018, her Q Score was 44, giving her the highest score of all current female television actors.

Perrette played the lead role as Jackie in the CBS sitcom Broke, which aired in 2020. In May 2020, Broke was cancelled after one season. On July 7, 2020, Perrette retired from acting.

Music
Perrette recorded her song "Fear" (co-written with Tom Polce) under the name "Stop Making Friends". The song was recorded for NCIS: The Official TV Soundtrack which was released on February 10, 2009. "Fear" was featured in the NCIS episode "Aliyah" (season 6 episode 25), according to the soundtrack's website.

Prior to this, Perrette was the lead singer in the Los Angeles-based all-female band Lo-Ball, using the stage name "Pauley P." The song "Can't Get Me Down" by Lo-Ball is heard in the movie Legally Blonde. Perrette appeared in "The Unnamed Feeling" video for heavy metal band Metallica from their album St. Anger. In 2011, Perrette was the featured vocalist on a song called "Fire in Your Eyes" by B. Taylor, a Las Vegas-based hip-hop artist.  She also sang on the 2011 single "Attention Please" by DMC.

Personal life

Perrette married Canadian actor and musician Coyote Shivers in 2000; the couple separated four years later, with their divorce becoming final in 2006. She was granted restraining orders against him, alleging that he subjected her to physical, emotional, and sexual abuse during and after their marriage.

Perrette worked with America's Most Wanted in February 2004 to present the city of Prattville, Alabama, with a check for $10,000, which will be used to supplement the reward offer for information leading to the arrest of the person who killed Shannon Paulk. Paulk was from Prattville, Alabama, near where Perrette had once lived as a child. Perrette also donated $10,000 to Detroit law enforcement officials in 2007 to be used as a reward for information regarding the disappearance/murder of Raven Jeffries, a seven-year-old Detroit girl. (Perrette's then-partner was from Detroit.) The story originally aired on America's Most Wanted on September 8, 2007, on Fox. She also asked them for help in finding the person(s) who killed her friend, Lisa Williamson, who was murdered in 2007 after her Detroit home was set on fire. In 2009, Perrette worked with America's Most Wanted on the case of Tammy Vincent.

Perrette supports many charitable organizations, including animal rescue organizations, the American Red Cross, civil rights organizations, and LGBT rights organizations. Perrette opposed the California ballot initiative Proposition 8 in 2008, writing a public letter in fall of that year urging votes against the measure. She is a member of the Hollywood United Methodist Church.

She dated cameraman Michael Bosman for four years before their engagement; however, the two did not marry, saying they would wait until everyone can get married in the United States. They instead filed for all the legal protections that are available to same-sex couples. Bosman did not propose until the legalization of same-sex marriage in California in June 2008. The couple campaigned very publicly against 2008 California Proposition 8. Perrette and Bosman split, and in December 2011 she announced her engagement to former British Royal Marine Thomas Arklie. She had again announced that the couple would not marry until Proposition 8 is invalidated.

Perrette, who is a natural blonde, was hospitalized in 2014 after "a severe allergic reaction to her [character's] trademark ink-black [hair] color." She told CBS News in Los Angeles that her face had swollen to twice its size and warned that "anyone out there [who] dyes their hair, particularly black, you need to be aware of the symptoms."

On November 12, 2015, Perrette was assaulted by a homeless man outside her Hollywood Hills home. Los Angeles Police arrested David Merck, 45, and charged him with suspicion of making criminal threats and felony assault. Perrette later told Entertainment Tonight that she does not blame her attacker nor does she hold ill will against him.

Perrette co-owned Donna Bell's Bake Shop, named for her mother, in Manhattan, New York City. The shop closed December 2020 after nearly 10 years of business.

On June 7, 2019, Perrette said she left NCIS due to an on-set dog-biting incident and alleged multiple physical assaults. She also stated that she was "terrified" of her former co-star Mark Harmon.

In September 2022, Perrette revealed that she had suffered a stroke in September 2021.

Filmography

Film

Television

Video games

Awards and nominations

References

Further reading
 Hagan, Molly (October 2014). "Pauley Perrette". Current Biography. Vol. 75, Issue 10, pp. 49–54.

External links

 
 
 Official account on Twitter
 Official channel on YouTube
 Pauley Perrette Bio at CBS - NCIS
 Pauley Perrette's band Stop Making Friends at MySpace

1969 births
20th-century American actresses
20th-century Methodists
21st-century American actresses
21st-century American poets
21st-century American women writers
21st-century Methodists
Actresses from Alabama
Actresses from Georgia (U.S. state)
Actresses from New Orleans
Actresses from North Carolina
Actresses from South Carolina
Actresses from Tennessee
American bloggers
American women rock singers
American film actresses
American punk rock singers
American television actresses
American United Methodists
American voice actresses
American women bloggers
American women poets
John Jay College of Criminal Justice alumni
American LGBT rights activists
Living people
Poets from Georgia (U.S. state)
Poets from New York (state)
Singers from New York City
Valdosta State University alumni
Women punk rock singers